The Komotini events occurred on 29 January 1990 between local Greek Christians and members of the ethnic Turkish minority in the Komotini area in northern Greece. The events started over the conviction and imprisonment of an ethnic Turkish MP, Sadik Achmet, by a Greek court. 400 shops were looted, and the offices of two Turkish newspapers ransacked. The clashes broke out after the murder of an ethnic Greek by a Muslim, while there were no Turkish casualties during the events.

Background
The Turkish minority, which is recognized by the Council of Europe as part of the Muslim minority in Western Thrace, with estimates varying from 50,000 (official census) to as high as 130,000 (Human Rights Watch). The term 'Turkish minority' is officially denied by Greece via using "Muslim Greeks" instead. Discrimination of the Turks has been criticized by the US and the European Parliament. On January 26, 1990, a Greek court jailed 2 Turkish leaders because they used the word "Turk" in their political organization. Turks in Greece cannot choose their religious leader (mufti).

According to Human Rights Watch the religious, educational, and language rights of the Turkish minority in Greece have been violated.

Events
The events started in Komotini, when 1,500 Greek citizens of Turkish origin [Turks in Greece] gathered near a mosque chanting "we are Turks" in protest of the 1982 Supreme Court ruling restricting the use of the word "Turkish". After the broadcast of an erroneous news item on a local radio station, organized Greek mobs damaged and looted around 400 shops of the Turkish minority as well as beating up some of the minority members including the acting mufti. The police did not intervene. After international reaction 12 Greeks were arrested for attacking Muslim premises.

According to an eye-witness reported by Helsinki Watch: Greek mobs consisted of approximately 40 to 50 people running wild, breaking windows, beating people and vandalizing cars; he saw a police car coming behind the mob, without making any effort to stop the Greek nationalists. Foreign observers stated Greek shops were not touched, indeed many of these shops displayed Greek flags in the windows, suggesting the riots were carefully orchestrated, and that the police did not interfere to stop the mobs.

Aftermath
The event increased the tension between Greece and Turkey when the Turkish Consul in Komotini was declared "persona non grata" and expelled from the country for having referred to the minority as "our kinsmen" in a letter he wrote to Greek authorities demanding the indemnification of damaged shops. Turkey retaliated by expelling the Greek Consul in Istanbul.

When a group from Synaspismos (Coalition of the Left) led by Maria Damanaki a member of Greek parliament visited the destroyed shops of the city two days after the events, they were verbally attacked by some Greek nationalists. During their meeting with the local politicians at the town hall, an angry mob gathered outside to protest, calling Damanaki a traitor. The group could not meet the minority representatives under such circumstances and had to abandon the town hall under police surveillance.

In 1991 when Turks protested the dismissal of their chosen Mufti by the Greek government the tension increased again, reportedly thirteen people were injured and the Mosque of Komotini was bombed.

See also
 Anti-Turkism
 Bulgarization of Turks in Bulgaria
 Provisional Government of Western Thrace
 Istanbul Pogrom

References
 
 
 UNHCR: Chronology for Muslims in Greece

Riots and civil disorder in Greece
Komotini riots
Komotini riots
Ethnic riots
January 1990 events in Europe
1990 murders in Greece
Persecution of Balkan Turks
Komotini